Mission: Impossible is a series of American action spy films based on the television series of the same name created by Bruce Geller. The series is mainly produced by and stars Tom Cruise, who plays Ethan Hunt, an agent of the Impossible Missions Force (IMF). The films have been directed, written, and scored by various filmmakers and crew, while incorporating musical themes from the original series by Lalo Schifrin.

Starting in 1996, the films (taking place starting six years after the events of the previous TV sequel series) follow the missions of the IMF's main field team, under Hunt's leadership, to stop an enemy force and prevent an impending global disaster. The series focuses on Hunt's character, as opposed to the television series's ensemble cast structure, although some characters, such as Luther Stickell (played by Ving Rhames) and Benji Dunn (played by Simon Pegg) have recurring roles.

The series has been positively received from critics and audiences. It is the 18th-highest-grossing film series of all time, earning over $3.5 billion worldwide, and is often cited as one of the best action franchises to date. The sixth and most recent film, titled Fallout, was released on July 27, 2018 and is currently the series's highest-grossing entry. The seventh and eighth films, two feature-length parts titled Dead Reckoning, will serve as a bookend to the series. Part One will be released in July 2023, and Part Two in June 2024. The films are co-produced and released by Paramount Pictures.

Films

Mission: Impossible (1996)

Ethan Hunt is framed for the murder of his IMF team during a botched mission in Prague and accused of selling government secrets to an arms dealer known only as "Max". On the run, Ethan seeks to uncover the real traitor and clear his name.

Mission: Impossible 2 (2000)

Ethan goes back in action and works with professional thief Nyah Nordoff-Hall (Thandiwe Newton). The duo go undercover to stop rogue IMF agent Sean Ambrose (Dougray Scott) (who is also Nyah's former lover) from stealing a deadly virus, starting a pandemic, and selling the antidote to the highest bidder.

Mission: Impossible III (2006)

Ethan is engaged to Julia Meade (Michelle Monaghan), who is unaware of his true job. He assembles a team to face the elusive arms and information broker Owen Davian (Philip Seymour Hoffman) who intends to sell a mysterious dangerous object known as "The Rabbit's Foot".

Mission: Impossible – Ghost Protocol (2011)

Ethan and the entire IMF are framed for the bombing of the Kremlin while investigating an individual known only as "Cobalt" (Michael Nyqvist). He and three other agents are left to stop him from starting a global nuclear war.

Mission: Impossible – Rogue Nation (2015)

Ethan Hunt comes under threat from the Syndicate. Faced with the IMF's disbandment, Hunt assembles his team for their mission to prove the Syndicate's existence and bring the organization down by any means necessary.

Mission: Impossible – Fallout (2018)

When an IMF mission to recover plutonium goes wrong, the world is faced with the threat of the Apostles, a terrorist group formed by former members of the rogue nation called the Syndicate. As Ethan Hunt takes it upon himself to fulfill the original mission, the CIA begins to question his loyalty and his motives.

Mission: Impossible – Dead Reckoning Part One (2023) 

In January 2019, it was announced that a seventh and eighth Mission: Impossible films were in development, with Christopher McQuarrie returning as writer and director of both films. Reportedly filmed back-to-back, the seventh film was originally scheduled for release on July 23, 2021, before being delayed to November 19, 2021, May 27, 2022, September 30, 2022, and July 14, 2023, due to the COVID-19 pandemic.

In September 2019, McQuarrie announced via his Instagram account that Hayley Atwell had joined both films' casts, which she later confirmed. Two months later, the director revealed the involvement of Pom Klementieff, and in late December Shea Whigham was confirmed as a cast member for the two upcoming movies. In January 2020, McQuarrie announced that Nicholas Hoult had also joined the cast, and Simon Pegg confirmed his return as Benji later the same month.

In February 2020, McQuarrie announced that Henry Czerny would reprise his role as Eugene Kittridge from the first film, whilst Vanessa Kirby confirmed her return as Alanna Mitsopolis / White Widow. Due to scheduling conflicts, Hoult was replaced by Esai Morales for both films. Similarly, Angela Bassett was originally going to appear in the film, but was later removed due to COVID-19 travel restrictions. In September 2021, the film's gaffer Martin Smith confirmed on Instagram that principal photography had officially wrapped.

Mission: Impossible – Dead Reckoning Part Two (2024) 

In January 2019, an eighth Mission: Impossible film was announced to be in development, written and directed by Christopher McQuarrie and filmed back-to-back with the seventh film. It was scheduled to be released on August 5, 2022, but was delayed to November 4, 2022, then to July 7, 2023, then to June 28, 2024, due to the COVID-19 pandemic.

Hayley Atwell joined the cast in September 2019, followed by Pom Klementieff and Shea Whigham. In January 2020, Nicholas Hoult and Simon Pegg were announced to be appearing in the film, but Hoult was later replaced by Esai Morales in both films due to scheduling conflicts.

In February 2020, it was announced that Henry Czerny and Vanessa Kirby would return as Eugene Kittridge and Alanna Mitsopolis, respectively. In February 2021, Deadline Hollywood reported that Part Two would no longer be filmed back-to-back with Part One. Filming of Part Two began shortly after production wrapped on Part One. It was announced that both films would be a send-off for Ethan Hunt. In December 2022, it was announced that principal photography had officially wrapped.

Cast and crew

Cast

Crew

Reception

Box office performance

Critical and public response
The Mission Impossible film series has received generally positive reviews, with the later three being acclaimed. Praise has been directed towards its cinematography, action sequences, stunts, musical score, and acting.

Music

Change to theme music 
The television version is in a rarely used  time (an unusual time signature with five crotchets to a bar) and is difficult to dance to, as was proven by a memorable segment of American Bandstand in which teenage dancers were caught off-guard by Dick Clark's playing of the Lalo Schifrin single release.

The opening theme music for the first six films are stylized renditions of Schifrin's original iconic theme, preserving the  rhythm, by Danny Elfman, Hans Zimmer, Michael Giacchino, Joe Kraemer and Lorne Balfe, respectively. Most of the versions included in the score also retained the  time signature.

However, for Adam Clayton and Larry Mullen, Jr.'s version featured on the first film's motion picture soundtrack, the time signature was changed to standard pop  time to make it more dance-friendly, although the intro is still in  time.

References

External links 

 Mission: Impossible series at the box office, from The Numbers

 
Films about the Central Intelligence Agency
Film series introduced in 1996
Action film series
Thriller film series
Cruise/Wagner Productions films
Paramount Pictures franchises
1990s English-language films
2000s English-language films
2010s English-language films
2020s English-language films